Nyamata is a town in the Bugesera District, southeastern Rwanda. Nyamata literally means "place of milk" from the two Kinyarwanda words "nya-" (of) and "amata" (milk). It is the location of Nyamata Genocide Memorial, commemorating the Rwandan genocide of 1994.

Location
Nyamata is located in Bugesera District, Eastern Province, directly south of Kigali, the national capital and the largest city in the country.

Overview

Nyamata is a small town in Bugesera District, Rwanda. Since 2017, a new airport, Bugesera International Airport, is under construction,  with the first phases expected to be completed in 2019.

The town is the location of Nyamata Genocide Memorial, commemorating the Rwandan genocide of 1994. Located at the site where Nyamata Parish Catholic Church once stood, the memorial contains the remains of over 45,000 genocide victims, almost all of whom were Tutsi, including over 10,000 who were massacred inside the church itself.

Population

According to the national population census of 15 August 2012, the population of Nyamata consisted of 17,076 people. As of 2022, it was confirmed that the numbers have since then grown to 34,922 people.

Nyamata has since then developed into a busy town with lots of infrastructures and facilities like Churches, Hotels and Factories put in place.

Points of interest
The following points of interest lie within the town limits or close to the edges of town: 
 Nyamata Genocide Memorial Centre
 Offices of Nyamata Town Council
 Nyamata central market
 A branch of the Bank of Kigali
 A branch of the Urwego Opportunity Bank 
 Bugesera International Airport, near the town of Rilima.

History

It is not well known what happened in the region before 1900. In 1900 there was a war between the Kingdom of Rwanda-Rwagasabo with Cyirima as the King, and the Kingdom of Bugesera whose King was Nsoro. Bugesera won the war, Nsoro captured Cyirima but did not kill him nor did he acquire the territory of Rwanda-Rwagasabo. After Nsoro died his son Ruganzu Ndori became King. Ruganzu Ndori was the last king of Bugesera, he died in 1962 when Rwanda became a republic.

See also
 Bank of Kigali
 Urwego Opportunity Bank

References

External links
 Website of Eastern Province, Rwanda (Kinyarwanda) & (English)
 Pictorial of Nyamata Genocidal Memorial

Bugesera District
Eastern Province, Rwanda
Populated places in Rwanda